Lewis Ormond (born 5 February 1994) is a New Zealand rugby sevens player. Ormond is a former basketballer.

Career
Born in Hāwera, Ormond was a New Zealand under-20 trialist and had three seasons in the Taranaki Sevens setup under Willie Rickards. Ormond was first selected for the New Zealand Sevens for the 2015 Hong Kong Sevens after impressing at the National Rugby Sevens Tournament in January. Ormond made his debut at the Hong Kong Sevens along with Jordan Bunce of Manawatu., and now plays for Stade Aurillacois.

Ormond earned sevens caps in the 2015–16 World Rugby Sevens Series and was selected for the New Zealand Sevens team for the inaugural 2016 Summer Olympics rugby sevens tournament.

Ormond was selected for the All Blacks Sevens squad for the 2022 Rugby World Cup Sevens in Cape Town. He won a silver medal after his side lost to Fiji in the gold medal final.

Personal life
Of Māori descent, Ormond affiliates to the Ngāti Kahungunu iwi. He is the brother of Jackson Ormond, a rugby player for Taranaki in the Mitre 10 Cup and former New Zealand Sevens player, whom he cites as his inspiration for his rugby career.

References

External links
 
 Lewis Ormond's All Blacks Sevens profile
 
 
 
 

1994 births
Living people
New Zealand male rugby sevens players
New Zealand international rugby sevens players
Rugby sevens players at the 2016 Summer Olympics
Olympic rugby sevens players of New Zealand
Rugby union players from Hāwera
Ngāti Kahungunu people
New Zealand Māori rugby union players